Moussa B. H. Youdim is an internationallly reknowwn Israeli neuroscientist specializing in neurochemistry and neuropharmacology. He is the discoverer of both monoamine oxidase (MAO) B inhibitors l-deprenyl (Selegiline) and rasagiline (Azilect) as anti-Parkinson drugs which possess neuroprotective activities. He is currently Professor Emeritus at Technion - Faculty of Medicine and President of Youdim Pharmaceuticals.

Early life
Youdim was born in Tehran, Iran second of five children. His father worked and traded with the British and wanted that the boys to be educated in England. He and his brother were sent to England boarding school in UK. He wanted to go to Medical school to study medicine and obtained his preclinical studies in Borough Polytechnique in London. He went to McGill University in Montreal and where he obtained his B.Sc., M.Sc and Ph.D in biochemistry between 1959-1966.

Scientific career
Youdim upon joining Professor Theodore L Sourkes's laboratory at Allan Memorial Institute, McGill Department of Psychiatry, began to work on the M.Sc.followed by Ph.D. He has focused most of his life on the field of neurochemistry and neuropharmacology of aminergic neurotransmitters in health and disease. In his M.Sc and Ph.D. Studies he purified mitochondrial MAO and demonstrated two forms of the enzymes, which were later named A and B by Johnson. One of his most important contributions to science was working with Professor Merton Sandler in London to study MAO inhibitors as anti-depressants and anti-Parkinson drugs. A chance meeting with Professor Peter Riederer resulted in employing the MAO-B inhibitor, l-deprenyl (selegiline), in Parkinson's disease since the human brain basal ganglia were rich in MAO-B and dopamine. The clinical study was a success and was confirmed by others in clinical studies and eventual approval of selegiline by FDA.

Youdim has published almost nine hundred papers and reviews and edited 45 books in neurochemistry, neuropharmacology, multi-target drug development, and transcriptomics.

He pioneered the study of brain iron dysregulation on brain function. This included its nutritional deficiency, which results in cognitive impairment and learning process in animal models and children with nutritional iron deficiency. And iron accumulation in brain neurons results in Parkinson's and Alzheimer's diseases, where iron may induce neurodegeneration from resultant oxidative stress.

Academic career

 1966–1971. Post-doctoral fellow at University of London Post Graduate School, Queen Charlotte Maternity Hospital in Merton Sandler's laboratory
 1971. Department of Biochemistry Cambridge University in K.F. Tipton's laboratory
 1972. Wellcome Trust Fellow at College de France in Paris at Jacques Glowinski's laboratory
 1973–1977. Oxford University, MRC Unit of Clinical Pharmacology and Faculty of Medicine
 1977–1995. Technion-Israel Institute of Technology Medical School, Professor and Chairman
 1983-2010. Finkelstein Professor of Life sciences, Technion-Israel Institute of Technology
 1991–1999. International Scholar in Residence at NIH Fogarty International Center for Advanced Study in Human Health Sciences, Bethesda
 1997–2012. Directors of Eve Top Center of Excellence for Neurodegenerative Diseases Research and Teaching and USA National Parkinson Disease Center of Excellence, Technion Faculty of Medicine
 2006-2008 Distinguished Scientific Professor at Hong Kong Polytechnic University and Department of Anatomy Hong Kong University
 2008–2013. Distinguished Professor of Neurobiology at Yonsei World Class University Programme, Seoul, South Korea.

He holds professorships at Armed Forces University Medical School in Bethesda; and in China Janin University, Materia Medica Shanghai University of Chinese Traditional Medicine; Ruijin Medical school, Shanghai and Qingdao University.

Industry involvement
Youdim served as consultant to Roche, TEVA Pharmaceuticals Ltd; Ciba Geigy, and Continental Pharmaceuticals,Brussels. He is president and CSO of Youdim Pharmaceutical. He is a discoverer of the anti-Parkinson drugs selelgiline (l-deprenyl) and developer of monoamine oxidase B inhibitor rasagiline (Azilect), which was considered to be the first disease modifying drug used for Parkinson's disease and TVP 3326, ladostigil, for Alzheimer's disease. Experts have recently questioned whether rasagiline actually has significant disease modifying properties.

Recognition

 1974. Anna Monika International Prize, Basel, Switzerland.
 1974. British Migraine Association Special Gold Medal, London, UK.
 1978. The Homayoon (Royal) Medal from the Shah, Tehran, Iran.
 1980. National Israel Psychobiology Institute Prize, Jerusalem, Israel.
 1986. Michael Landau Research Prize, Tel Aviv, Israel.
 1984. United States Department of Commerce, Inventor's Award, Isolation and cuLture of Adrenal Meduallry Endothelial Cells Producing Blood Clotting Factor 8. 
 1990. Senator Burda International Prize for Parkinson's disease, Vienna, Austria.
 1991. Claudius Galenus Gold Medal Prize Drug of the year l-Deprenyl (selegiline), Berlin, Germany.
 1991. Deutscher Neuropharmakologie (AGNP) Prize, Nuremberg, Germany.
 1991. Eli Lilly Prize for Neuropharmacology, Indianapolis, USA.
 1993. The New England Prize of Excellence in Science, Boston, USA.
 1994 and 1977. Henning Andersen Prize, Stockholm, Sweden.
 1997. "Honoris Causa" Honorary Doctor of Philosophy, Semmelweiss University Medical School, Hungary.
 1998. "Honoris Causa" Honorary Doctor Of the Philosophy University of Pisa and Ecole Superior Nationale, Pisa, Italy.
 2006. Henry Taub Prize for Excellence in Research, Technion-Israel Institute of Technology, Haifa, Israel.
 2006. Nathan Shock Lecture, NIH Institute of Aging, Bethesda, USA.
 2007. Melvin Yahr Lecture, Mount Sinai School of Medicine, New York, USA.
 2007. World Federation of Neurology 17th International Congress of Parkinson's disease Award for Contribution to Parkinson's disease, Amsterdam, Netherland.
 2008. Thomas Schkeler Lecture, Ohio State University, Columbus, USA.
 2009. Shanghai Baiyulan Award, Ruijin Medical School. Shanghai, China.
 2010. Elected Member of Leopoldina German Academy of Sciences, Halle, Germany.
 2011. Theodore l. Sourkes lecture, Parkinson's disease, McGill University, Montreal, Canada.
 2011. European College of Neuropsychopharmacology (ECNP) Life Time Achievement Prize in Neuropsychopharmacology, Amsterdam, Netherland.
 2011. EMET Prize for Brain Science, Jerusalem, Israel.
 2012. Giant Pioneer of Catecholamine Research Prize, National Institute Of Health, 11th International Catecholamine Congress, Asilomar, USA.
 2012. CINP (International College of Neuropsychopharmacology) Pioneering Neuropsychopharmacology Prize, Stockholm. 
 2012. Arvid Carlsson Medal, CINP, Stockholm, Sweden.
 2013. Elected Honorary Member of Israel Neuroscience Society.
 2022. The Israel Prize in Life Sciences Research, Jerusalem, Israel.
 2023  Rambam Award , Haifa, Israel.

Editorial boards
On the editorial boards of 40 journals, including British Journal of Pharmacology, Journal of Neurochemistry, Journal of Neural Transmission, Experimental Neurology, International Neurochemistry, Psychopharmacology. International Journal of Neuropsychopharmacology, Archives of Pharmacology, Frontiers in Pharmacology, European Journal of Pharmacology, Biogenic Amines, Neuropsychobiology, Neurochemical Research; Brain Research, CNS Drug Review, Future Drugs, Drugs of Today, and Neurotherapeutics.

Publications

References

External links
 
 
 
 Technion - Prof. Emeritus Moussa Youdim is the recipient of the Israel Prize in Life Sciences for 2022  Retrieved 2022-04-10.
 American Technion Society - Prof. Emeritus Moussa Youdim Wins Prestigious Israel Prize in Life Sciences Retrieved 2022-04-10.

1940 births
Israeli expatriates in the United Kingdom
Israeli expatriates in the United States
Israeli expatriates in Canada
Iranian emigrants to Israel
People from Tehran
Living people
Israeli Mizrahi Jews
Israeli neuroscientists
Academic staff of Technion – Israel Institute of Technology